The 1983 Southwest Conference men's basketball tournament was held March 10–12 at Reunion Arena in Dallas, Texas. The first round took place March 7 at the higher seeded campus sites. 

Number 1 seed Houston defeated 5 seed  62-59 to win their 3rd championship and receive the conference's automatic bid to the 1983 NCAA tournament.

Format and seeding 
The tournament consisted of 9 teams in a single-elimination tournament. The 3 seed received a bye to the Quarterfinals and the 1 and 2 seed received a bye to the Semifinals.

Tournament

References 

1982–83 Southwest Conference men's basketball season
Basketball in the Dallas–Fort Worth metroplex
Southwest Conference men's basketball tournament